The 2012–13 season was Leicester City F.C.'s 108th season in the English football league system and their 61st (non-consecutive) season in the second tier of English football. It was their fourth consecutive season in the Championship.

Leicester began with a promising first half of the season and sat in second place at the beginning of February. However, a dramatic downturn in form which saw the Foxes win just 2 of their following 16 games saw Leicester not only drop out of the automatic promotion places, but the play-offs as well and they began the final game of the season against local rivals Nottingham Forest in eighth place. The Foxes won 2–3 with a dramatic late winner from Anthony Knockaert, and coupled with Bolton Wanderers failing to win, Leicester took the final play-off spot and finished sixth.

Leicester eventually lost to Watford in the play-off semi-final though, after a dramatic winner deep into injury time by Troy Deeney, which came as the result of a counter-attack from Anthony Knockaert's missed penalty (which would have sent Leicester through to the final).

Pre-season

Pre-season events
Note: This section does not include close season transfers or pre-season match results, which are listed in their own sections below.
29 June 2012 – Conrad Logan signs a one-year contract extension which ends in 2013.
19 July 2012 – Wes Morgan is named as Club Captain.

Kit and sponsorship
On 28 April 2012, it was announced on the official Leicester City website that the new kit supplier for the 2012–13 season would be Puma.

Friendlies

Events
Note:This section does not include transfers or match results, which are listed in their own sections below.

21 September 2012 – Liam Moore signs a contract extension to 2015.
21 September 2012 – Academy players, Harry Panayiotou and Joe Dodoo, sign their first professional contracts.
25 March 2013 – Jermaine Beckford makes his debut for Jamaica.
1 May 2013 – George Taft, Jacob Blyth and James Pearson sign one-year contract extensions.
1 May 2013 – Rob Paratore signs his first professional contract ending in 2014.
7 May 2013 – Jamie Anton and Jak McCourt sign professional contracts.
15 May 2013 – Alie Sesay and Callum Elder sign new deals.

Players and staff

2012–13 squad

2012–13 backroom staff

Transfers

In

Out

Loans in

Loans out

Released

Results

Football League Championship

Promotion Play-offs

FA Cup

Football League Cup

Awards

Club awards
At the end of the season, Leicester's annual award ceremony, including categories voted for by the players and backroom staff, the supporters and the supporters club, saw the following players recognised for their achievements for the club throughout the 2012–13 season.

Divisional awards

Championship statistics

Championship table

Club standings

Results by round

Scores by club
Leicester City score given first.

Club statistics
All data from LCFC.com and FoxesTalk Stats

Appearances
Last updated on 16 May 2013

|}

Top scorers

Most assists
Last Updated: 16 May 2013

Disciplinary record
Last Updated: 16 May 2012

Captains

Suspensions

Penalties

Overall seasonal record
Note: Games which are level after extra-time and are decided by a penalty shoot-out are listed as draws.

References

2012-13
2012–13 Football League Championship by team